The following outline is provided as an overview of and topical guide to Poland:

The Republic of Poland is a sovereign country located in Central Europe.  Poland is bordered by Germany to the west; the Czech Republic and Slovakia to the south; Ukraine, Belarus and Lithuania to the east; and the Baltic Sea and Kaliningrad Oblast, a Russian exclave, to the north. The total area of Poland is 312,679 km² (120,728 sq mi), making it the 69th largest country in the world and 9th in Europe. Poland has a population of over 38.5 million people, which makes it the 33rd most populous country in the world.

The establishment of a Polish state is often identified with the adoption of Christianity by its ruler Mieszko I in 966 (see Baptism of Poland), when the state covered territory similar to that of present-day Poland. Poland became a kingdom in 1025, and in 1569 it cemented a long association with the Grand Duchy of Lithuania by uniting to form the Polish–Lithuanian Commonwealth. The Commonwealth collapsed in 1795, and its territory was partitioned among Prussia, Russia, and Austria. Poland regained its independence in 1918 after World War I but lost it again in World War II, occupied by Nazi Germany and the Soviet Union. Poland lost over six million citizens in World War II, and emerged several years later as a socialist republic within the Eastern Bloc under strong Soviet influence. In 1989 communist rule was overthrown and Poland became what is constitutionally known as the "Third Polish Republic". Poland is a unitary state made up of sixteen voivodeships. Poland is also a member of the European Union, NATO and OECD.

General reference 

 Pronunciation: 
 Common English country name:  Poland
 Official English country name:  The Republic of Poland
 Common endonym(s): Polska
 Official endonym(s): Rzeczpospolita Polska
 Adjectival(s): Polish, polski(a)–polskie
 Demonym(s): Polish
 Etymology: Name of Poland
 International rankings of Poland
 ISO country codes:  PL, POL, 616
 ISO region codes:  See ISO 3166-2:PL
 Internet country code top-level domain:  .pl

Geography of Poland 

Geography of Poland
 Poland is: a sovereign state
 Member state of the European Union
 Location:
 Northern Hemisphere and Eastern Hemisphere
 Eurasia
 Europe
 Central Europe
 Eastern Europe
 Time zone:  Central European Time (UTC+01), Central European Summer Time (UTC+02)
 Extreme points of Poland
 High: Rysy 
 Low: Żuławy Wiślane 
 Land boundaries:  3,071 km
 796 km
 541 km
 535 km
 467 km
 418 km
 210 km
 104 km
 Coastline:  Baltic Sea 440 km
 Population of Poland: 38,115,967 (June 30, 2007)  - 33rd most populous country

 Area of Poland: 312679 km2
 Atlas of Poland

Environment of Poland 

Main: Environment of Poland
 Climate of Poland
 Ecoregions in Poland
 Renewable energy in Poland
 Geology of Poland
 Protected areas of Poland
 Biosphere reserves in Poland
 National parks of Poland
 Wildlife of Poland
 Fauna of Poland
 Amphibians of Poland
 Birds of Poland
 Mammals of Poland

Natural geographic features of Poland 
 Glaciers of Poland
 Islands of Poland
 Lakes of Poland
 Mountains of Poland
 Volcanoes in Poland
 Rivers of Poland
 Waterfalls of Poland
 Valleys of Poland
 World Heritage Sites in Poland

Regions of Poland 

Regions of Poland

Ecoregions of Poland 

List of ecoregions in Poland
 Ecoregions in Poland

Administrative divisions of Poland 

Administrative divisions of Poland
 Voivodeships of Poland
 Powiats of Poland
 Gminas of Poland

Provinces of Poland 

Provinces of Poland
 Districts of Poland

Municipalities of Poland 

Municipalities of Poland
 Capital of Poland: Warsaw
 Cities of Poland

Demography of Poland 

Demographics of Poland

Government and politics of Poland 

 Form of government: unitary semi-presidential representative democratic republic
 Capital of Poland: Warsaw
 Elections in Poland
 Political parties in Poland

Branches of the government of Poland 

Government of Poland

Executive branch of the government of Poland 
 Head of state: President of Poland, Andrzej Duda
 Head of government: Prime Minister of Poland, Mateusz Morawiecki
 Cabinet of Poland

Legislative branch of the government of Poland 

 National Assembly of the Republic of Poland (bicameral)
 Upper house: Senate of Poland
 Lower house: Sejm of Poland

Judicial branch of the government of Poland 

Court system of Poland
 Supreme Court of Poland

Foreign relations of Poland 

Foreign relations of Poland
 Diplomatic missions in Poland
 Diplomatic missions of Poland

International organization membership 
The Republic of Poland is a member of:

Arctic Council (observer)
Australia Group
Bank for International Settlements (BIS)
Black Sea Economic Cooperation Zone (BSEC) (observer)
Central European Initiative (CEI)
Confederation of European Paper Industries (CEPI)
Council of Europe (CE)
Council of the Baltic Sea States (CBSS)
Euro-Atlantic Partnership Council (EAPC)
European Bank for Reconstruction and Development (EBRD)
European Investment Bank (EIB)
European Organization for Nuclear Research (CERN)
European Space Agency (ESA) (cooperating state)
European Union (EU)
Food and Agriculture Organization (FAO)
International Atomic Energy Agency (IAEA)
International Bank for Reconstruction and Development (IBRD)
International Chamber of Commerce (ICC)
International Civil Aviation Organization (ICAO)
International Criminal Court (ICCt)
International Criminal Police Organization (Interpol)
International Development Association (IDA)
International Energy Agency (IEA)
International Federation of Red Cross and Red Crescent Societies (IFRCS)
International Finance Corporation (IFC)
International Hydrographic Organization (IHO)
International Labour Organization (ILO)
International Maritime Organization (IMO)
International Mobile Satellite Organization (IMSO)
International Monetary Fund (IMF)
International Olympic Committee (IOC)
International Organization for Migration (IOM)
International Organization for Standardization (ISO)
International Red Cross and Red Crescent Movement (ICRM)
International Telecommunication Union (ITU)
International Telecommunications Satellite Organization (ITSO)
International Trade Union Confederation (ITUC)
Inter-Parliamentary Union (IPU)

Multilateral Investment Guarantee Agency (MIGA)
Nonaligned Movement (NAM) (guest)
North Atlantic Treaty Organization (NATO)
Nuclear Suppliers Group (NSG)
Organisation internationale de la Francophonie (OIF) (observer)
Organisation for Economic Co-operation and Development (OECD)
Organization for Security and Cooperation in Europe (OSCE)
Organisation for the Prohibition of Chemical Weapons (OPCW)
Organization of American States (OAS) (observer)
Permanent Court of Arbitration (PCA)
Schengen Convention
Southeast European Cooperative Initiative (SECI) (observer)
United Nations (UN)
United Nations Conference on Trade and Development (UNCTAD)
United Nations Disengagement Observer Force (UNDOF)
United Nations Educational, Scientific, and Cultural Organization (UNESCO)
United Nations High Commissioner for Refugees (UNHCR)
United Nations Industrial Development Organization (UNIDO)
United Nations Interim Force in Lebanon (UNIFIL)
United Nations Mission for the Referendum in Western Sahara (MINURSO)
United Nations Mission in Liberia (UNMIL)
United Nations Mission in the Central African Republic and Chad (MINURCAT)
United Nations Mission in the Sudan (UNMIS)
United Nations Observer Mission in Georgia (UNOMIG)
United Nations Operation in Côte d'Ivoire (UNOCI)
United Nations Organization Mission in the Democratic Republic of the Congo (MONUC)
Universal Postal Union (UPU)
Western European Union (WEU) (associate)
World Confederation of Labour (WCL)
World Customs Organization (WCO)
World Federation of Trade Unions (WFTU)
World Health Organization (WHO)
World Intellectual Property Organization (WIPO)
World Meteorological Organization (WMO)
World Tourism Organization (UNWTO)
World Trade Organization (WTO)
World Veterans Federation
Zangger Committee (ZC)

Law and order in Poland 

Law of Poland
 Capital punishment in Poland
 Constitution of Poland
 Crime in Poland
 Human rights in Poland
 LGBT rights in Poland
 Freedom of religion in Poland
 Law enforcement in Poland

Military of Poland 

Military of Poland
 Command
 Commander-in-chief:
 Ministry of Defence of Poland
 Forces
 Army of Poland
 Navy of Poland
 Air Force of Poland
 Special forces of Poland
 Military history of Poland
 Military ranks of Poland

Local government in Poland 

Local government in Poland

Other 
 Political scandals of Poland

History of Poland 

History of Poland
Timeline of the history of Poland
Current events of Poland
 Military history of Poland
 History of rail transport in Poland

Culture of Poland 

Culture of Poland
 Architecture of Poland
 Cuisine of Poland
 Ethnic minorities in Poland
 Festivals in Poland
 Languages of Poland
 Media in Poland
 National symbols of Poland
 Coat of arms of Poland
 Flag of Poland
 National anthem of Poland
 People of Poland
 Prostitution in Poland
 Public holidays in Poland
 Records of Poland
 Religion in Poland
 Buddhism in Poland
 Christianity in Poland
 Hinduism in Poland
 Islam in Poland
 Judaism in Poland
 Sikhism in Poland
 World Heritage Sites of Poland

Art in Poland 
 Art in Poland
 Cinema of Poland
 Literature of Poland
 Music of Poland
 Television in Poland
 Theatre in Poland

Sports in Poland 

Sports in Poland
 Football in Poland
 Poland at the Olympics

Economy and infrastructure of Poland 

Economy of Poland
 Economic rank, by nominal GDP (2018): 22nd (twenty-second)
 Agriculture in Poland
 Banking in Poland
 National Bank of Poland
 Communications in Poland
 Internet in Poland
 Companies of Poland
Currency of Poland: Złoty
ISO 4217: PLN
 Energy in Poland
 Bełchatów Power Station – largest thermal power station in Europe, and one of largest fossil fuel power stations in the world. It produces 27-28 TWh of electricity per year, 20% of Poland's total power generation.
 Energy policy of Poland
 Oil industry in Poland
 Health care in Poland
 Mining in Poland
 Poland Stock Exchange
 Tourism in Poland
 Water supply and sanitation in Poland

Transportation in Poland 

Transport in Poland
 Airports in Poland
 Rail transport in Poland
 High-speed rail in Poland
 Roads in Poland
 National roads in Poland
 Motorways in Poland
 Expressways in Poland
 Voivodeship roads
 Powiat roads
 Gmina roads

Education in Poland 

Education in Poland
List of schools in Poland
List of universities in Poland

Health in Poland 

Health in Poland

See also 

List of international rankings
Member state of the European Union
Member state of the North Atlantic Treaty Organization
Member state of the United Nations
Outline of Europe
Outline of geography

References

External links 

 General
Poland.gov.pl - Polish national portal
Polish Information
Ministry of Foreign Affairs
Poland at the World Factbook
Background Note: Poland

 Travel

Commonwealth of Diverse Cultures: Poland's Heritage

 Photos
Photos from Poland

Poland
 1